Russell Township is one of eleven townships in Camden County, Missouri, USA.  As of the 2000 census, its population was 2,495.

Russell Township was established in 1841.

Geography
It contains nine cemeteries: Creach, Edwards, Green, Hurst, Mills, Raggs, Stanton, Warren and Wiley Gott.

The streams of A B Creek, Broadus Branch, Brush Creek, Brush Creek, Jacks Creek, Kolb Branch, Little Brush Creek, Little Niangua River, Long Branch, Macks Creek, Pennel Branch, Phillips Branch, Watson Branch and Woodall Branch run through this township.

Public Areas
Public Areas include:

Cedar Camp which contains rental cabins, a park, a campground, and a Little Niangua canoe access.
Bannister Ford which contains a bridge where Route CC crosses the Little Niangua River and a canoe access.
Fiery Fork Conservation Area

References

 USGS Geographic Names Information System (GNIS)

External links
 US-Counties.com
 City-Data.com

Townships in Camden County, Missouri
Townships in Missouri